MF & DAZN: X Series 003 features Deen the Great vs. Walid Sharks, a professional crossover boxing match contested between American YouTuber Deen the Great and Iraqi TikToker Walid Sharks. The bout took place on November 19, 2022, at the Moody Center, Austin, Texas. Deen the Great defeated Sharks via third-round technical knockout.

Background 
During the broadcast of MF & DAZN: X Series 001, it was announced that Misfits Boxing's second event would take place on October 15, 2022, and would see Hasim Rahman Jr. vs Vitor Belfort headline the vent at Sheffield Arena, Sheffield, England. However, on September 15, the bout was postponed to MF & DAZN: X Series 003.

However, on November 14, Belfort pulled out after being tested positive for COVID-19. American former football defensive end and mixed martial artist Greg Hardy was announced as Belfort's replacement. Deen the Great vs. Walid Sharks was then promoted as the headline bout of X Series 003.

Card 
The card for the fight, consisting of the main event and co-main events were Deen the Great vs. Walid Sharks and Josh Bruckner vs Chase DeMoor. The undercard consists of Hasim Rahman Jr. vs. Greg Hardy, King Kenny vs. DK Money, FaZe Temperrr vs. Overtflow, and Minikon vs. NickNackPattiwack.

Fight card

MF & DAZN: X Series 004 

During the broadcast, it was announced that KSI will take on Dillon Danis (later changed to FaZe Temperrr after Danis withdrew) in Misfit's fourth event, MF & DAZN: X Series 004 at Wembley Arena, London, England on January 14, 2023.

Notes

References

External links

2022 in boxing
2022 in Internet culture
Boxing matches
Crossover boxing events
DAZN
KSI
YouTube Boxing events
YouTube